Leonid Slutsky may refer to:
 Leonid Slutsky (football coach) (born 1971), Russian association football manager and former player
 Leonid Slutsky (politician) (born 1968), Russian politician